Alex (Uldis) Kurzem (born 1935 or 1936) is an Australian pensioner originally from Eastern Europe, living in Melbourne; a centre-point of a long-standing controversy regarding his Holocaust memoir which has led to a financial windfall in the early 21st century. He was the subject of a TV documentary and a best-selling book by his son, translated into 13 languages; both entitled The Mascot.

According to the story, Alex Kurzem is the former boy mascot (hence the book title) of a Latvian police Schutzmannschaft Battalion 18, who witnessed the massacre of his Jewish mother as a five-year-old boy and subsequently emigrated to Australia. Kurzem maintained that he is a Holocaust survivor from Belarus. However the authenticity of his account was challenged in 2009 by Dr Barry Resnick among others. When put under further scrutiny by the Jewish-American scholars, and asked to prove his survivor's tale by taking a DNA test, Kurzem refused. He also dismissed out of hand the archival records of the Hoover Institution at Stanford University as allegedly falsified; but eventually admitted: "I might be anybody, but I have got no proof who I am."

In 2020, genetic genealogist Colleen Fitzpatrick concluded that Kurzem is Jewish, comes from the region of Belarus he claimed to, and has living relatives in Canada. These cousins provided family photographs that bolster the case for Kurzem's account of his origin.

Autobiography
Kurzem claimed he pieced together his autobiography from bits of memories substantiated with the help of his son by documents and evidence discovered while in search of his forgotten identity. He concluded that he was Ilya or Ellyeh the Yiddish pronunciation of Elija, and that his parents were Solomon Galperin (in Hassidic Yiddish pronounced Shloimeh Halpern) and Chana Gildenberg (the Hassidic Yiddish pronunciation of Goldenberg), who were Jewish. On October 21, 1941, Gildenberg and her son Duvid and daughter were murdered along with approximately 1,600 other Jews in Koidanova (now Dzyarzhynsk, Belarus). Solomon Galperin escaped extermination and joined a group of Soviet partisans. He was later caught and sent to Auschwitz, returning to Dzyarzhynsk after the war. He remarried, and, according to his newly born son, died in 1975 without ever knowing that his eldest son had survived.

Kurzem said that he escaped, while seeing the mass murder and that after months of living in the forest he was captured and taken to a site were Jews were being assassinated. He was saved from probable death by Jekabs Kulis, a sergeant of a Latvian police battalion after begging for bread and making the drunken soldiers laugh. Kulis adopted him as the battalion's mascot, after secretly warning him never to reveal his Jewish identity. According to Kurzem's memory Kulis and his commander Lobe changed the story and rehearsed with him a narrative by which he was a Russian orphan who had lost his parents in the forest. The story was reiterated to him following the war by his former commanders and Latvian family. This was the narrative he told his family until he began opening up to the past.

Throughout his childhood, Kurzem appeared in Nazi propaganda media as an Aryan mascot, including at least one newsreel. Kurzem says that on one occasion his commanding officer, Karlis Lobe, ordered him to hand out chocolates to other Jews to calm them as they boarded trucks that took them to be exterminated at the chocolate Leime factory in Riga.

In 1944, according to Kurzem, with the Nazis facing almost certain defeat, and after trying to escape the unit in the Wolichow marshes, the commander of the Latvian SS unit sent Kurzem to live with a Latvian family, and with them was removed to a displaced persons camp in Hamburg, Germany, from which he emigrated to Australia in 1949. He worked in a circus and eventually became a television repair man in Melbourne. He had three sons with his wife Patricia (died 2003). All the time, he kept his past life to himself, not even telling his wife or children. It was not until 1997 that he finally told his family, and along with his son, Mark, set about discovering more about his past.

Media
In 2002, Kurzem's son Mark (died 2010) wrote and produced a documentary (with Lina Caneva) entitled The Mascot, which tells his father's story of his childhood among the Latvian SS. Mark subsequently wrote a book, The Mascot, Unravelling the Mystery of My Jewish Father's Nazi Boyhood, which tells the same story. It was reported his story has inspired a full-length Hollywood feature film. Kurzem has received reparations from the Jewish Claims Conference as a victim of Nazi persecution.

On May 19, 2011, Melbourne reporter Keith Moor published an article that questions the veracity of Kurzem's story and reports of simultaneous investigations by the German and U.S. governments as well as the Jewish Claims Conference into Kurzem's claims of actually being Jewish and a victim of Nazi persecution. On September 21, 2012, Dan Goldman, a reporter for Israel's daily newspaper Haaretz, published an article about the investigation into Kurzem's story. Kurzem was quoted in the article that he "never said" he was Ilya Galperin.

Suspicions about the accuracy and authenticity of Kurzem's story were first raised in the late 1990s at the Melbourne Holocaust Centre. The Testimonies Director at the Centre, Phillip Maisel, who recorded Kurzem's story formed the impression that his interviewee was not being entirely truthful: "There was something strange about his story, something didn't add up." Forensic researcher Colleen Fitzpatrick, who was previously instrumental in exposing two books about the Holocaust as fraudulent, wrote that there are similarities in the Narrative to those, and that Maisel, an experienced interviewer of many survivors, had read accounts from the Yizkor book of Koidanow that the massacre was done in a surprise action and was over within hours contrary to Kurzem's claims. According to her, Maisel had asked Kurzem about hiding his circumcision and received an evasive answer very untypical of other survivors, and that Maizel claimed Kurzem said he was unsure about his memory of his mother being shot. Fitzpatrick, along with Dr. Barry Resnick, discovered that the GILF document on which his reparations were based and which is published in the book is an unauthentic translation to English and the original was never submitted. No records of an Ilya Galpern/Halperin or his mother exist although records of other Galperin family members murdered in the town do exist. She claims Kurzem was removed from the Melbourne Holocaust Centre after remarking that it was a business.  Fitzpatrick wrote that she had an email exchange between Mark Kurzem and a cousin of his, speaking about receiving the highest payment possible. And concluded: "Mr. Kurzem not only has and will continue to experience substantial financial gain and recognition from his books and his movie, he also lectures internationally to school children, thereby feeding the next generation with what may be distortions of the truth."

In 2013, Alex Kurzem has been cleared to continue receiving compensation from the German Government. The Jewish Claims Conference ordered the investigation. The report of the ombudsman was "satisfied Mr Kurzem was Jewish; was separated from his parents during the war; lived under a false identity for at least 18 months, and; that his life had been in danger".

There is no doubt that he is the "mascot" boy, but the members of the Latvian SS unit still claim they were not part of the Slonim massacre and had not participated in any atrocities in accordance with the deposition Kurzem wrote for Kārlis Lobe. In the book Mark Kurzem tells of the doubts raised on both sides, claiming the Latvian denials were planned and expected but that the Jewish ones were a surprise.

In 2020, genetic genealogist Colleen Fitzpatrick concluded that Kurzem is Jewish, comes from the region of Belarus he claimed to, and has living relatives in Canada. These cousins provided family photographs that bolster the case for Kurzem's account of his origin.

See also
 Misha Defonseca (Misha: A Mémoire of the Holocaust Years, 1997)
 Martin Grey (Au nom de tous les miens)
 Herman Rosenblat (Angel at the Fence)
 Rosemarie Pence (Hannah: From Dachau to the Olympics and Beyond, 2005)
 Enric Marco (Memorias del infierno, 1978)
 Donald J. Watt (Stoker, 1995)
 Denis Avey (The Man who Broke into Auschwitz, 2011)
 Binjamin Wilkomirski (Fragments, 1995)

References

Bibliography
Mark Kurzem & Lina Caneva, The Mascot (Australian documentary for ABC television, 2002)
Mark Kurzem, The Mascot (2007)

External links
http://www.heraldsun.com.au/news/more-news/nothing-to-hide-holocaust-survivor/story-fn7x8me2-1226059229104
http://www.theage.com.au/articles/2004/04/07/1081222527300.html 
http://news.bbc.co.uk/2/hi/europe/6945847.stm
https://web.archive.org/web/20121102214022/http://www.canada.com/nationalpost/news/story.html?id=f8aee6f6-c8bc-4053-ac56-354809d37355&k=25791 
https://web.archive.org/web/20101127223923/http://afp.google.com/article/ALeqM5hiu_S9WJWGSqNpE_BWgOVMEy3tfA 
http://www.cbsnews.com/stories/2009/02/20/60minutes/main4815552.shtml

1936 births
Living people
Australian Jews
Australian people of Belarusian-Jewish descent
Australian people of Latvian descent
Belarusian Jews
Holocaust survivors
People from Melbourne